Omar Bravo Tordecillas (born 4 March 1980) is a Mexican former professional footballer who played as a striker. He is Guadalajara's all-time leading scorer in all matches.

Club career

Club Deportivo Guadalajara
Omar Bravo has scored 132 goals with Guadalajara. Omar Bravo was brought to the Guadalajara youth system by José Luis Real. He made his debut with the senior team on 17 February 2001 against Tigres UANL in a 0–0 draw. Bravo became a regular starter for the team during the 2002 Apertura, playing 15 games and scoring 6 goals.

In 2006, Bravo participated in a successful season for Club Deportivo Guadalajara, helping the team win the Apertura championship title, as well as achieving first place for the top goal scorer in the Mexico First Division and registering 11 goals for the tournament. Bravo scored the leading goal in the first leg match of the 2006 Apertura final, which ended in a 1–1 draw against Toluca.

In 2007, Bravo displayed skills at the Clausura division, winning the golden boot for most goals in the league with 11 goals in 17 matches. Club Deportivo Guadalajara becoming champion in the Apertura 2006 made them eligible to participate in the Champions Cup. Bravo scored in his first appearance in the CONCACAF Champions' Cup against W Connection F.C. as well as in the first match of the semifinals against D.C. United. In the final, on 8 April 2007, he helped Club Deportivo Guadalajara to a 2–2 draw against CF Pachuca at the CONCACAF Champions' Cup Final, scoring 2 Goals in the first match

Omar Bravo scored his 100th goal on 26 April 2008 in a 4–0 victory over Club Puebla Bravo became the 2nd player in Club Deportivo Guadalajara history to reach 100 goals, only behind Salvador Reyes, who has 122 goals.  He played his last match of his first stint in C.D. Guadalajara by scoring his 101st goal against C.F. Monterrey in the quarter-finals, which they tied 4–4, losing 8–5 on aggregate.

Deportivo de La Coruña
On 22 May 2008, Deportivo de La Coruña announced an agreement between the club and Omar Bravo for the next three years. Omar Bravo left Guadalajara as a free agent. Bravo became the second Mexican on Deportivo's squad at that time, after Andrés Guardado. Omar Bravo made his debut on 31 August 2008 in a 2–1 victory over Real Madrid. On 8 December 2008 he scored his first league goal against Málaga in a 2–0 victory. With only nine league appearances (only two of them as a starter), it was evident that his stint at the Spanish club was not as successful as expected.

Loan to Tigres UANL
On 5 March 2009, he was loaned out to Mexico side Tigres UANL for the remainder of the Clausura 2009 season. However, he had a bad season, as he did not have much playing time due to the inactivity in Spain.  He made 6 appearances and scored no goals.

Return to Club Deportivo Guadalajara
After his stint with Deportivo and the loan at Tigres UANL, Omar returned to the Chivas where he signed a 1-year contract with the club and appeared in 32 games, as well as scoring 5 goals. Later on, he would be again loaned by the Chivas to Sporting Kansas City, to play some League games where he scored two goals, and the Copa Santander Libertadores where Chivas became Runner Up in the tournament.

Sporting Kansas City
On 8 August 2010, Sporting Kansas City announced that Bravo was signed as the squad's first Designated Player since Claudio López. Bravo would join SKC beginning with the 2011 season. Upon arrival in Kansas City, Bravo mentioned that he was very happy to join the team, and that he believed the level of play in MLS was among the best in the world. In his debut for the club against Chivas USA, he showed off his skilled form and managed to score two goals for his new club. He scored nine goals for Sporting and was named Latin Player of the Year.

Cruz Azul
On 12 December 2011, Sporting Kansas City announced that Bravo would not be returning in 2012 and would instead be signing with Cruz Azul in his native Mexico. He scored a brace against San Luis F.C. in a 3–1 home win. After underperforming with Cruz Azul, the club later transferred Bravo to Atlas on a loan. Later, he revealed that he felt he failed with Cruz Azul.

Loan to Atlas
Bravo joined Atlas of Guadalajara on loan before the Clausura 2013. He proved effective by scoring seven times during his stint there.

Return to Guadalajara
Bravo returned to C.D. Guadalajara after Cruz Azul agreed to sell him after his loan deal expired. He scored on his return debut against Santos Laguna. During the Apertura 2015 season, Bravo scored 10 goals in 16 appearances, which was tied for 6th on the individual scoring table. Despite Bravo's return to form, Guadalajara missed the playoffs, placing 12th on the table. On 12 August 2015, Bravo scored a brace at home against Morelia that converted him into C.D. Guadalajara's all-time top scorer in league matches, surpassing club legend Salvador Reyes with 123 goals. On 29 September 2015, Bravo scored a goal against Monterrey, making him the club's all-time top scorer in all official and nonofficial matches.

He led the team to win the Copa MX on 4 November 2015, their first major title in nine years. On 10 April 2016, Bravo scored his final goal in the Clausura 2016 season against Puebla in 3–0 away win. His team Chivas, had the chance to get into la Liguilla, and they did, but once in it they were not able to beat their most hated rivals, Club America. They had an intense Quarter-Final against Club America, they tied in the first leg 0–0 and lost 2–1 in the second leg. Omar Bravo, 36, was not able to score. Bravo finished the 2015–2016 season scoring 11 goals in 34 games.
On 10 July 2016, Bravo scored his last goal for Chivas playing against recent Copa MX champion Veracruz in the last minute of the game ending in 2–0 win giving them their first Supercopa MX title their second in nine months and, clinched Guadalajara a spot for the Copa Libertadores 2017.

Carolina RailHawks
On 13 July 2016, it was announced that Bravo had signed with NASL club Carolina RailHawks during halftime of a match against West Ham United, becoming the first Mexican player to join the club.

Phoenix Rising FC 
On 9 February 2017, it was announced that Bravo had signed with recently re-branded USL club Phoenix Rising FC (formerly Arizona United).
In September 2017, Bravo would no longer be an active player for the club.

Leones Negros UdeG 
On July 4, 2019, Leones Negros announced that Omar Bravo would be a guest player for the 45th anniversary game against Rayados de Monterrey on July 13, 2019, and a friendly against Forward Madison on July 16, 2010, On July 24 it was announced that Omar Bravo would come out of retirement to play for the following season.

International career
Bravo played for various levels of the Mexico youth national system and in several amateur tournaments, including the 2004 Summer Olympics in Athens. He accumulated 66 caps and scored 15 goals for the senior national team.

On 11 June 2006, playing at the 2006 FIFA World Cup in Germany, Bravo scored two goals in Mexico's 3–1 victory over Iran and was named the Man of the Match. Two matches later, he missed a penalty against Portugal in a 2–1 loss for Mexico, and did not play in the game against Argentina.

In 2007, Bravo was selected by former coach Hugo Sánchez to represent his country in a series of friendly international matches and to take part in the 2007 Gold Cup and 2007 Copa América, where he scored three goals.

Bravo also played in World Cup Qualifiers and in the 2009 CONCACAF Gold Cup. He was recalled to the national team in March 2013.

Honours
Guadalajara
Mexican Primera División: Apertura 2006
Copa MX: Apertura 2015
Supercopa MX: 2016

Deportivo La Coruña
UEFA Intertoto Cup: 2008

Mexico
Gold Cup: 2003, 2009

Individual
C.D Guadalajara All Time Scorer (132 Goals)
Mexican Primera División Rookie of the Season: Apertura 2002
Mexican Primera División Forward of the Season: Clausura 2007
Mexican Primera División Golden Boot: 2004–05, Apertura 2006, Clausura 2007
CONCACAF Champions Cup Golden Boot: 2007
MLS All-Star: 2011
MLS Latino Player Of The Year: 2011
Premios Univision Deportes Player of the year: 2015

Career statistics

International goals

References

External links
 
 
 
 

1980 births
Living people
Sportspeople from Los Mochis
Footballers from Sinaloa
Association football forwards
Mexico international footballers
Footballers at the 2004 Summer Olympics
Olympic footballers of Mexico
CONCACAF Gold Cup-winning players
2005 FIFA Confederations Cup players
2006 FIFA World Cup players
2007 CONCACAF Gold Cup players
2007 Copa América players
2009 CONCACAF Gold Cup players
Liga MX players
La Liga players
C.D. Guadalajara footballers
Deportivo de La Coruña players
Tigres UANL footballers
Sporting Kansas City players
Cruz Azul footballers
Atlas F.C. footballers
North Carolina FC players
Phoenix Rising FC players
Mexican expatriate footballers
Mexican expatriate sportspeople in the United States
Expatriate footballers in Spain
Mexican expatriate sportspeople in Spain
Expatriate soccer players in the United States
Major League Soccer players
Major League Soccer All-Stars
Designated Players (MLS)
North American Soccer League players
USL Championship players
Mexican footballers